Zambar is a village in Aq Kahriz Rural District, Nowbaran District, Saveh County, Markazi Province, Iran. At the 2006 census, its population was 76, in 21 families.

References 

Populated places in Saveh County